Daniel Kuzniecka (born 30 November 1965 in Panama) is an Argentine screenwriter, producer and actor.

Television

Film
As of 2014, Kuzniecka has taken part in 9 films:

Theatre
 El espacio entre tú y yo
 Quetza, el conquistador (adapted from the original by Federico Andahazi; actor: Agustín García)

References

External links

1965 births
Argentine people of Polish-Jewish descent
Argentine people of Uruguayan descent
People from Panama City
Argentine male film actors
Argentine male stage actors
Argentine film producers
Argentine screenwriters
Living people